The Lafayette Apartment Building is an historic structure located in the Shaw neighborhood in the Northwest Quadrant of Washington, D.C.  George S. Cooper  was the architect for this building, which was one of the earliest apartment buildings in Washington.  Built in 1898 it incorporated elements of the Queen Anne style into an affordable middle-class development.  It was listed on the National Register of Historic Places in 1994.

References

Residential buildings completed in 1898
Apartment buildings in Washington, D.C.
Queen Anne architecture in Washington, D.C.
Residential buildings on the National Register of Historic Places in Washington, D.C.
1898 establishments in Washington, D.C.